Alexander MacAuley may refer to:

 Alexander McAulay (1863–1931), professor of mathematics and physics at the University of Tasmania
 Alexander MacAuley (footballer), Scottish footballer